Constantino Jesús Noya was a Bolivian football midfielder.

Career 

During his career he has convocated without appearances for the Bolivia national team at the 1930 FIFA World Cup.
He has passed his career with the Oruro Royal

References

External links

Bolivian footballers
Bolivia international footballers
1930 FIFA World Cup players
Association football midfielders
Year of birth missing
Year of death missing